Tranby Croft is a large Grade II listed Victorian country house and estate at Anlaby, near Hull in the East Riding of Yorkshire, England. The house is now the co-educational, independent day school, Tranby School.

The house is built in white brick with ashlar dressing in three storeys with a nine bay frontage.

History
Tranby Croft was built  by Hull shipowner Arthur Wilson (1836–1909). In 1890 the house was the location of the royal baccarat scandal, which involved accusations that Sir William Gordon-Cumming, 4th Baronet, had cheated at illegal card games attended by Albert Edward, Prince of Wales.

Arthur was succeeded by his son Captain Arthur Stanley Wilson (1868–1938), who was the Conservative MP for Holderness. The latter married Alice Cecile Agnes Filmer and was succeeded in turn by his son Arthur Thomas Wilson, who adopted the additional surname of Filmer.

Hull High School for Girls moved to Tranby Croft after the Second World War and Hull Grammar School moved to Tranby Croft from its Cottingham site in 2005. The two schools merged into Hull Collegiate School, which in 2021 was renamed Tranby.

References

External links

Hull Collegiate School

Country houses in the East Riding of Yorkshire
Grade II listed buildings in the East Riding of Yorkshire